Kolkata Knight Riders (KKR) are a franchise cricket team based in Kolkata, India, which plays in the Indian Premier League (IPL). They are one of the eight teams that competed in the 2017 Indian Premier League. They were captained by Gautam Gambhir, while former Knight Riders all-rounder Jacques Kallis was in his third season as the team's head coach.

Pre-season
 In December 2016, Wasim Akram stepped down as the bowling coach and mentor, citing "professional commitments and time constraints."

Player auction

The player auction for the 2017 Indian Premier League was held on 20 February in Bangalore.

The Knight Riders bought the following players at the auction:

Trent Boult
Chris Woakes
Rishi Dhawan
Nathan Coulter-Nile
Rovman Powell
R Sanjay Yadav
Ishank Jaggi
Darren Bravo
Sayan Ghosh

In April the side signed New Zealander Colin de Grandhomme as a replacement for Andre Russell who was banned for one year in January 2017 for a violation of doping codes.

Squad 
 Players with international caps are listed in bold.

Season standings

Matches

References

External links 
 
 Kolkata Knight Riders on IPL Twenty20

Kolkata Knight Riders seasons
2017 Indian Premier League